The American Juvenile Electric was a car made by the American Metal Wheel & Auto Co of Toledo, Ohio, in 1907. Its wheelbase was a mere , but it was complete with ‘lights, bells, etc.’ and had tiller steering. Its top speed was 10 mph (16 km/h), and it could go 20 miles on a charge. At $800, it cost more than many full-size cars.

References
^ G. Marshall Naul, "American Juvenile Electric", in G.N. Georgano, ed., The Complete Encyclopedia of Motorcars 1885-1968  (New York: E.P. Dutton and Co., 1974), pp. 42.

Defunct motor vehicle manufacturers of the United States
Toy cars and trucks
Electric vehicles introduced in the 20th century
Motor vehicle manufacturers based in Ohio
Vehicle manufacturing companies established in 1907
American companies established in 1907
1907 establishments in Ohio
Vehicle manufacturing companies disestablished in 1907
1907 disestablishments in Ohio